Paropeas is a genus of air-breathing land snails, terrestrial pulmonate gastropod mollusks in the family Achatinidae.

The subgenus Paropeas within the genus Prosopeas was  elevated to generic status in 1994, based on the anatomy of Paropeas achatinaceum.

Species 
Species within the genus Paropeas include: 
 Paropeas achatinaceum
 Paropeas tchehelense

References

External links
 Abstract of a paper on this genus

Subulininae